Luna is an Italian and Spanish given name of Latin origin. It means moon. In Roman mythology, Luna was the divine personification of the Moon. It is a name that has risen in popularity in recent years, in part due to its use for a character in the Harry Potter series by J.K. Rowling. Widespread usage of the name also increased after it was used for their daughters by well-known personalities. Names beginning with or containing the letter L have also been particularly fashionable for girls.

Usage
It first entered the top 1,000 most popular names for girls list in the United States in 2003, has ranked among the top 20 names there since 2019 and was the 11th most popular name for American girls born in 2021. It is also well used in other countries. It ranked among the top 100 names for girls in Australia, Belgium, Canada, Chile, Denmark, France, Ireland, Italy, the Netherlands, New Zealand, Norway, Portugal, Slovenia, Spain, Sweden, Switzerland and the United Kingdom, among other countries, in recent years.   It is also found as a surname, sometimes with a prefix, for example, de Luna or Deluna. The similar sounding Runa has been used in at least one instance as a nonstandard pronunciation in Japan for the Japanese kanji 月, meaning moon. Other standard pronunciations for the kanji include Tsuki or Getsu, while non-standard pronunciations include Oto, Su, Zuki and Mori.

People with this name

Given name
 Luna (footballer) (born 1971), Spanish association football player, also known as Paco LunaYahya
 Luna (South Korean singer) (born 1993 as Park Sunyoung), a South Korean singer
 Luna Blaise (born 2001), American actress and singer
 Luna Leopold (1915–2006), American scientist
 Luna Solomon (born 1996), Eritrean sport-shooter
 Luna Vachon (1962–2010), Canadian professional wrestler
 Luna Voce (born 1988), Dutch-Italian model and beauty pageant titleholder

Surname
 Alejandro Luna (1939–2022), Mexican scenic designer and lighting technician
 Álvaro de Luna, 1st Duke of Trujillo (c. 1389–1453), Spanish politician
 Anna Paulina Luna (born 1989), U.S. Congresswoman
 Antonio Luna (1866–1899), Filipino general
 Antonio Luna (born 1991), Spanish footballer
 Audrey Luna, American operatic soprano
 Betty Luna (1927–2004), All-American Girls Professional Baseball League pitcher
 Braulio Luna (born 1974), Mexican association football player
 Cardozo M. Luna (born 1953), Philippine politician
 Diego Luna (born 1979), Mexican actor
 Emerico Luna (1882 – 1963), Italian anatomist
 Francisco Luna Kan (born 1925), Mexican politician
 Gabriel Luna (born 1982), American film, television, and stage actor
 Genaro García Luna (born 1968), Mexican politician
 Héctor Luna (born 1980), Dominican baseball player
 Jeff de Luna (born 1984), Filipino pool player
 Jonathan Luna (1965–2003), U.S. Federal prosecutor
 Josep Joan Bigas i Luna (1946–2013), Spanish film director
 Juan Luna (1857–1899), Filipino painter
 Julio César Luña (born 1973), Venezuelan weightlifter
 Pauleen Luna (born 1988), Filipino actress and host
 Kat DeLuna (born 1987), American singer of Dominican descent
 Martha Luna, Venezuelan fashion designer and stylist
 Nicholas Luna, personal assistant to Donald Trump
 Pedro de Luna (1328–1423), Avignon Pope Benedict XIII
 Santiago Luna (born 1962), Spanish professional golfer
 Solomon Luna (1858–1912), American rancher and banker
 Tristán de Luna y Arellano (1519–1571), Spanish Conquistador

Fictional characters
 Luna (Sailor Moon), supporting character in the Sailor Moon franchise
 Luna Lovegood in the Harry Potter series
 Luna (Yu-Gi-Oh! 5D's), supporting character in the anime series Yu-Gi-Oh! 5D's
 Luna, the Moon and one of the main characters from the educational children’s television series Bear in the Big Blue House
 Luna, a cute little girl who is a fanatic of science in the animated series Earth to Luna!
 Luna, a Nightblood in the TV series The 100
Luna, a character from the video game Dota 2
 Luna, a character in the TV series All My Children
Luna, a character in the visual novel game Zero Escape: Virtue's Last Reward
 Lluna, a supporting character in Minecraft Story Mode Season 2
 Luna Inverse, elder sister of Lina Inverse of the anime, manga and novel series Slayers
 Luna Loud, one of the ten Loud sisters in the American animated series The Loud House
 Luna, a witch and unlockable playable character in the video game Shrek Super Slam.
 Luna Maximoff, supporting character in the Marvel Comics universe
 Luna Mothews, the teenage daughter of the Mothman in Monster High
 Lunafreya Nox Fleuret (also known simply as Luna), a key character in Final Fantasy XV
 Luna O'Neill (born Liam), the title character of the novel Luna
 Princess Luna (Peter Pan) in The Adventures of Peter Pan
 Princess Luna (My Little Pony), one of the two royal alicorn sisters in My Little Pony: Friendship Is Magic
 Queen Luna, the queen of Solaria and the mother of Stella in Winx Club
 Luna, a character in Dead or Alive Xtreme Venus Vacation.
Luna, a tapir, and owner of the "Dream Suite" in the video game Animal Crossing
Luna Valente, the titular protagonist of the Argentine-Mexican Disney Channel Latin America telenovela Soy Luna

See also 
 Luna (goddess), the ancient Roman divine personification of the Moon
 The Moon, Earth's only natural satellite, known as Luna in Latin and other languages

References 

English feminine given names
Latin feminine given names